Anatoliy Seryohin (born 26 March 1972) is a football manager and former player.

He played for FC Metalist Kharkiv, FC Avanhard Merefa and FC Start Chuhuiv, and he coached several junior teams of FC Metalist Kharkiv, FC Arsenal Kharkiv, FC Helios Kharkiv.

External links 
 
 Anatoliy Seryohin. FC Helios Kharkiv (profile)

1972 births
Living people
Footballers from Kharkiv
Ukrainian footballers
Association football defenders
Ukrainian expatriate footballers
Expatriate footballers in Kazakhstan
Expatriate footballers in Belarus
FC Avanhard Merefa players
FC Metalist Kharkiv players
FC Zhenis Astana players
FC Shakhtyor Soligorsk players
FC Arsenal Kharkiv players
Ukrainian football managers
FC Helios Kharkiv managers